The following is a timeline of the history of the city of Anchorage, Alaska, United States.

20th century

 1914 – Anchorage founded as a railroad construction camp.
 1915
 Chamber of Commerce and Anchorage Memorial cemetery established.
 Alaska Railroad construction begins in Anchorage.
 1916
 Anchorage Hotel built.
 Population: 3,332.
 1917 – Anchorage Daily Times newspaper begins publication.
 1920
 Anchorage incorporated as a town.
 Leopold David becomes mayor.
 Population: 1,856.
 1922 – Anchorage Public Library Association organized.
 1924 – KFQD radio begins broadcasting.
 1936
 City Hall built.
 Alaska State Fair begins near Anchorage.
 1939 – Federal Building constructed.
 1940 – U.S. military Elmendorf Field begins operating near Anchorage.
 1941 – U.S. Army Fort Richardson built near Anchorage.
 1943 – Fort Richardson National Cemetery established near Anchorage.
 1946 
 Alaska News begins publication.
 Anchorage Symphony Orchestra founded.
 1947 – Fourth Avenue Theatre opens.
 1950
 Anchorage Philatelic Society founded.
 Population: 35,651 metro.
 1951
 Anchorage Airport built.
 Seward Highway (Seward-Anchorage) completed.
 1953
 KENI television begins broadcasting.
 Anchorage High School opens.
 1954 – Anchorage Community College established.
 1955
 Loussac Public Library opens.
 Cook Inlet Historical Society founded.
 U.S. military Kulis Air National Guard Base begins operating.
 1959 – Anchorage becomes part of the new U.S. state of Alaska.
 1964
 January 1: Greater Anchorage Area Borough created.
 March 27: The 9.2  Alaska earthquake affected anchorage with high intensity shaking that caused the control tower at Anchorage International Airport to collapse, and while the tsunamis (that were so destructive elsewhere) did not affect the city, landslides and other extreme ground deformation had significant impact, causing an estimated $116 million in damages  ($ billion in  dollars)..
 Nordic Skiing Association of Anchorage active.
 1965 – Anchorage Youth Symphony organized.
 1966 – Alaska Federation of Natives headquartered in Anchorage.
 1967 – George M. Sullivan becomes mayor.
 1968
 Anchorage Museum and Alaska Children's Zoo open.
 Kincaid Park established.
 1969 – Sundowner Drive-In cinema opens. 
 1970
 Chugach State Park established.
 Population: 48,081.
 Alyeska Pipeline Service Company headquartered in Anchorage.
 1971 – University of Alaska Anchorage established.
 1973 – Don Young becomes U.S. representative for Alaska's at-large congressional district.
 1975 – Municipality of Anchorage created; Anchorage Assembly established Sullivan continues as municipal mayor.
 1979 – Food Bank of Alaska established.Food Bank of Alaska – ABOUT US
 1980 – Population: 174,431.
 1982
 Tony Knowles becomes mayor.
 Sister city relationship established with Darwin, Australia.
 1983 – ARCO Tower and Hunt Building constructed.
 1987
 5th Avenue Mall in business.
 Tom Fink becomes mayor.
 1988 
 Alaska Aviation Museum opens on Lake Hood.
 Alaska Center for the Performing Arts opens.
 1990 – Population: 226,338.
 1992
 Mount Spurr volcano erupts.
 1993 – Alaska Botanical Garden opens.
 1994
 Anchorage Press in publication.
 Rick Mystrom becomes mayor.
 1995 – Binky (polar bear) dies in the Alaska Zoo.
 1996 – City website online (approximate date).
 1997
 Alaska Native Medical Center established.
 Alaska Native Tribal Health Consortium headquartered in city.
 1998 – May: Alaska Natives political demonstration.
 1999 – Alaska Native Heritage Center opens.
 2000 – George Wuerch becomes mayor.

21st century

 2001 – January: Anchorage paintball attacks.
 2003 – Mark Begich becomes mayor.
 2007 – Anchorage Historic Preservation Commission established.
 2008
 Alaska Dispatch begins publication.
 Dena'ina Civic and Convention Center and Linny Pacillo Parking Garage open.
 2009 – Matt Claman becomes mayor, succeeded by Dan Sullivan.
 2010
 Tikahtnu Commons cinema opens.
 Population: 291,826.
 2018 – A 7.0 earthquake strikes the city, along with several aftershocks, causing extensive damage.

See also
 History of Anchorage, Alaska
 National Register of Historic Places listings in Anchorage, Alaska
 List of mayors of Anchorage, Alaska

References

Bibliography

 
 
 
 
 
  (fulltext via Open Library)

External links

 
 
 Items related to Anchorage, Alaska, various dates (via Digital Public Library of America).

 
Lists of places in Alaska
Anchorage
Years in Alaska